Eric Johansson (born January 7, 1982) is a Swedish-Canadian former professional ice hockey player.

Playing career 
Canadian-born Johansson started his hockey career in 1997, playing for Tri-City Americans in the junior league Western Hockey League. In the 2002–03 season, he joined the Albany River Rats in AHL, scoring 53 points in 151 games during the regular seasons. After three seasons with Albany, the last one spent primarily in ECHL with Augusta Lynx, he moved to Sweden and signed with Mora IK in the Swedish elite league Elitserien. After two seasons with the side he signed with another Elitserien team, HV71, after having started the season with TPS in the Finnish SM-liiga. During the Swedish playoff finals, Johansson scored the game-winning goal in game six and secured the championship for HV71.

In June 2008, he signed a two-year deal with Leksands IF in the Swedish second tier league, HockeyAllsvenskan.

On October 23, 2010, Johansson signed with the Sapa Fehérvár AV19 of the Erste Bank Eishockey Liga league.

Career statistics

Awards 
 Western Hockey League East Second All-Star Team 2002
 Swedish Champion with HV71 in 2008.

References

External links 
 

1982 births
Fehérvár AV19 players
Albany River Rats players
Augusta Lynx players
Canadian ice hockey centres
Canadian people of Swedish descent
HV71 players
Leksands IF players
Living people
Minnesota Wild draft picks
Mora IK players
New Jersey Devils draft picks
Ice hockey people from Edmonton
HC TPS players
Tri-City Americans players
Canadian expatriate ice hockey players in Hungary
Canadian expatriate ice hockey players in Finland
Canadian expatriate ice hockey players in Sweden